Albert Abram Aftalion (October 21, 1874, Rusçuk, Ottoman Empire – December 6, 1956, Geneva, Switzerland) was a French economist.

He taught at the Paris University (1925–1939). He co-founded the academic journal Revue économique in 1950 and presided over its board of directors.

Literary works 
 Les crises périodiques de surproduction, 1913

References 

 Encyclopaedia Judaica, art. "Aftalion, Albert"
  Nenovsky N, (2006). Exchange Rate and Inflation: France and Bulgaria in the Interwar Period and the Contribution of Albert Aftalion (1874-1956)

External links 
 http://www.univ-lille1.fr/clerse/Sitecles/pages/cles39/article1.htm (French, English)
 https://web.archive.org/web/20060617083506/http://cepa.newschool.edu/het/profiles/aftalion.htm (French)
 http://cruel.org/econthought/profiles/aftalion.html (Japanese)
 https://web.archive.org/web/20060506175700/http://iteconomica.net/economica/Aftalion-%20Albert-1133.html (Italian)

French economists
Jewish economists
People from Ruse, Bulgaria
Bulgarian people of Jewish descent
Bulgarian emigrants to France
Academic staff of the University of Paris
19th-century French Sephardi Jews
20th-century French Sephardi Jews
1874 births
1956 deaths